Michael Martínez may refer to:

 Michael Martínez, Dominican baseball player
 Michael Christian Martinez, Filipino Olympic figure skater
 Michael N. Martinez, Utah lawyer
 Mike Martinez, American politician from Texas
 J. Michael Martinez, American poet